The British Columbia Unity Party was a political party in British Columbia, Canada. The party was founded as an attempted union of five conservative parties: the Reform Party of British Columbia, the British Columbia Social Credit Party, the British Columbia Conservative Party, the British Columbia Party, and the Family Coalition Party of British Columbia. Members from the first four parties joined with the Family Coalition Party to refound the Family Coalition Party as the BC Unity Party on January 10, 2001. The party was formed to present a united conservative option to voters in opposition to the centre-right BC Liberals and the centre-left New Democratic Party (NDP).

History
The party was founded in January 2001.

Five months after the party was founded, it nominated 56 candidates across the province for the May 16, 2001 provincial elections. During the election campaign, BC Unity positioned itself as a solidly conservative party, in contrast to the BC Liberals.  Despite being included in the leaders debate, along with Premier Dosanjh and Liberal Leader Gordon Campbell the unpopularity of the NDP government was so great that most conservative-minded voters chose to vote for the BC Liberals, rather than split the right-of-centre vote once again.  The party received only 3.2% of the vote (51,426).

On September 1, 2004, BC Unity and the British Columbia Conservative Party announced an agreement-in-principle for the two parties to merge under the Conservative Party name. The deal, however, fell through after BC Conservative Leader Barry Chilton withdrew. At the Unity annual general meeting held on September 24 and 25, 2004 in Coquitlam, the BC Unity Party was presented with another proposal of merger by the Conservatives. The Unity delegates did not accept this proposal and instead, affirmed the original agreement-in-principle. This action was not accepted by the BC Conservatives and the merger failed. BC Unity leader Chris Delaney blamed himself for the failure of the merger and resigned.

Many BC Unity members left the party prior to the September 2004 annual general meeting in order to join the Conservatives and to influence them into accepting the agreement-in-principle. When the merger failed, these former members did not return to the Unity party.

In 2005, BC Unity named Daniel Stelmacker as its interim leader. Stelmacker had been a party candidate for the Nanaimo-Parksville electoral district in the 2001 election.  In 2005, Stelmacker was the party's sole nominated candidate for the 2005 provincial election, running in the Skeena riding. He won 224 votes, 1.74% of the total for the riding.

The party held its last annual general meeting on Saturday, October 29, 2005, in Maple Ridge, British Columbia.

On November 29, 2006, the party issued a news release to announce that it was looking for a new leader and for candidates for the 2009 provincial election.

On January 26, 2008, the BC Unity Party Board decided to poll the membership regarding the merger of the Party with the BC Conservatives or its de-registration.  A General Meeting was called for Saturday March 29, 2008 in Surrey. The poll returns indicated 4:1 ratio in favour of a merger with the BC Conservative Party, and the General Meeting confirmed this motion. The BC Conservative Party accepted the former BC Unity Party memberships at their April 19, 2008 executive meeting in Abbotsford. The BC Unity Party de-registered five registered constituency associations, and planned to complete the merger and de-registration process before the BC Conservative Party AGM in Kamloops on Saturday June 7, 2008.

See also
 List of British Columbia political parties

Unity Party
Conservative parties in Canada
Surrey, British Columbia
Right-wing populism in Canada
Unity Party
Unity Party
Political parties established in 2001
Political parties disestablished in 2008